Borboridea is a genus of flies in the family Stratiomyidae.

Species
Borboridea megaspis Kertész, 1916
Borboridea microcephalum (Kraft & Cook, 1961)

References

Stratiomyidae
Brachycera genera
Taxa named by Kálmán Kertész
Diptera of North America
Diptera of South America